Tedcastles Oil Products, Ltd. (Top Oil) is an Irish petrol company founded in 1960 which trades under the brand name "TOP". Before a rebranding in 1998, the company traded as "Tedcastle's Oil". Top Oil is a medium-sized Irish distributor of petroleum fuels.

The Tedcastle Group was acquired by Irving Oil of Canada in 2018.

Petrol stations
The company operates petrol stations mainly outside Dublin. It has over 205 locations nationwide ( 25 of them are company owned).
In 2010, Top Oil acquired a fuel company in Galway called Sweeney Oil, out of receivership for a nominal purchase price . Top oil have grown in recent years through vulture purchasing of distressed oil companies from bank receivership, examples including Tougher Oil in Kildare and Sweeney Oil in Galway.
In late 2010, Top Oil's 6 separate sites were finally opened along the Galway motorway, which are all in alliance with Applegreen.
In 2012, the brand was changed to Top Oil – Fueling Ireland and in 2016, the company re-entered the forecourt shop sector with the acquisition of 10 company owned locations.

Convenience stores
From 1998 to 2004, the company operated a convenience store chain on a franchise basis with ADM Londis. These stores were known as "Londis Topshop". This allowed forecourts to become franchisees of both Londis and TOP at once. However it also had high street stores in competition with ADM Londis itself. In 2004, the stores were acquired by ADM and rebranded to simply Londis.

In 2018, Top Oil works in partnership with a number of retailers across their network including SPAR, Mace and Daybreak.

Competition
Top Oil's main competition comes from Maxol, Certa, Texaco and Circle K.

References

Oil companies of the Republic of Ireland
1960 establishments in Ireland